Heinz Bäni (18 November 1936 – 10 March 2014) is a Swiss football midfielder who played for Switzerland in the 1966 FIFA World Cup. He also played for Grasshopper Club Zürich, FC Zürich, and FC La Chaux-de-Fonds.

References

1936 births
2014 deaths
Swiss men's footballers
Switzerland international footballers
Association football midfielders
Grasshopper Club Zürich players
FC Zürich players
FC La Chaux-de-Fonds players
1966 FIFA World Cup players